Calliostoma psyche, common name the psyche top shell, is a species of sea snail, a marine gastropod mollusk in the family Calliostomatidae.

Description
The size of the shell varies between 15 mm and 24 mm. This is the southern variety of Calliostoma bairdii of which W.H. Dall considered it to be a variety. It is paler and more delicately colored. It is less elevated and its lateral outlines are slightly concave.

Distribution
This species occurs in the Gulf of Mexico and in the Atlantic Ocean from North Carolina to Key West, USA, at depths between 26 m and 443 m.

References

 Rosenberg, G., F. Moretzsohn, and E. F. García. 2009. Gastropoda (Mollusca) of the Gulf of Mexico, pp. 579–699 in Felder, D.L. and D.K. Camp (eds.), Gulf of Mexico–Origins, Waters, and Biota. Biodiversity. Texas A&M Press, College Station, Texas

External links
 

psyche
Gastropods described in 1888